Puerto Rico Highway 538 (PR-538) is a north–south road located entirely in the municipality of Santa Isabel, Puerto Rico.

Major intersections

Related route

Puerto Rico Highway 5538 (PR-5538) is a spur of PR-538 located in Santa Isabel. This road is a bypass located southwest of the downtown area and goes from PR-538 to PR-1 and PR-5507.

See also

 List of highways numbered 538

References

538
Santa Isabel, Puerto Rico